Eubacterium barkeri, previously known as Clostridium barkeri, is a bacterium belonging to the Bacillota.

References

External links
Type strain of Eubacterium barkeri at BacDive -  the Bacterial Diversity Metadatabase

Eubacteriaceae
Bacteria described in 1972